The Szob-Nagybörzsöny forest railway is a  forest railway in Hungary. It runs from Szob to Nagybörzsöny, and was formed by the merger of three separate organisations. The railway is notable for having switch-back operation.

Motive power
Vehicles are restricted to certain sections of the line.

References

Rail transport in Hungary
Railways with Zig Zags